Eden Zanker (born 11 November 1999) is an Australian rules footballer playing for the Melbourne Football Club in the AFL Women's competition (AFLW). Zanker was drafted by Melbourne with the club's first selection and sixth pick overall in the 2017 AFL Women's draft. She made her debut in the six point win against  at Casey Fields in round 5 of the 2018 season.

References

External links 

1999 births
Living people
Melbourne Football Club (AFLW) players
Australian rules footballers from Victoria (Australia)
Bendigo Pioneers players (NAB League Girls)